Beta-secretase is a protein family that includes in humans Beta-secretase 1 and Beta-secretase 2.

References 

Single-pass transmembrane proteins